Personal Software Services (PSS) was a British software company based in Coventry, founded by Gary Mays and Richard Cockayne in 1981. The company was acquired by Mirrorsoft in 1987. PSS produced video games for the ZX Spectrum, Commodore 64, Amiga,  Atari ST, Atari 8-bit family, Amstrad CPC, Oric and IBM PC compatibles.

PSS was known for strategic wargames, such as Theatre Europe and Falklands '82. Several games produced by the French company ERE Informatique were distributed in Britain by PSS, including Get Dexter.

History
Personal Software Services was founded in Coventry, England, by Gary Mays and Richard Cockayne in 1981. The company had a partnership with French video game developer ERE Informatique, and published localised versions of their products to the United Kingdom. The Strategic Wargames series was conceptualised by software designer Alan Steel in 1984. During development of these titles, Steel would often research the topic of the upcoming game and pass on the findings to other associates in Coventry and London. Some games of the series were met with controversy upon release, such as Theatre Europe. In 1983, the company received recognition for being "one of the top software houses" in the United Kingdom, and was a finalist for BBC Radio 4's New Business Enterprise Award for that year.

In 1988, Cockayne took a decision to alter their products for release on 16-bit consoles, as he found that smaller 8-bit home computers such as the ZX Spectrum lacked the processing power for larger strategy games. Cockayne claimed that PSS were not pulling out of the 8-bit market, but no more 8-bit games were released post-1988.

Following years of successful sales throughout the mid 1980s, Personal Software Services experienced financial difficulties, in which Cockayne admitted that "he took his eye off the ball." The company was acquired by Mirrorsoft in February 1987, and was later dispossessed by the company due to strains of debt.

Games

Blade Alley, 1983
Metro Blitz, 1983
The Guardian, 1983
Cosmic Split, 1983
Light Cycle, 1983
Centipede, 1983
Invaders, 1983
Hopper, 1983
The Ultra, 1983
The Battle For Midway, 1984
Deep Space, 1984
Frank 'n' Stein, 1984
Les Flics, 1984
Maxima, 1984
Xavior, 1984
The Covenant, 1985
Macadam Bumper, 1985
Swords and Sorcery, 1985
Theatre Europe, 1985
Annals of Rome, 1986
Falklands '82, 1986
Get Dexter, 1986
Iwo Jima, 1986

After Mirrorsoft acquisition
Battle of Britain, 1987
Battlefield Germany, 1987
Bismarck, 1987
Legend of the Sword, 1987
Pegasus Bridge, 1987
Sorcerer Lord, 1987
Tobruk, 1987
Firezone, 1988
Austerlitz, 1989
Final Frontier, 1989
Waterloo, 1989
Battle Master, 1990
The Final Battle, 1990
Champion of the Raj, 1991
J. R. R. Tolkien's Riders of Rohan, 1991

References

External links 
PSS at gamefaqs.com
PSS at World of Spectrum

Defunct video game companies of the United Kingdom
Video game companies established in 1981
Video game companies disestablished in 1988
Defunct companies of England
Companies based in Coventry
1981 establishments in England
1988 disestablishments in England
British companies disestablished in 1988
British companies established in 1981